Ñuble may refer to: 

 Ñuble Region, in Chile
 Ñuble River, in Ñuble Region in Chile
 Ñuble metro station, in Santiago

See also
 Ñuble Province (disambiguation)
 Ñublense, a Chilean football team